William Robert Greer (September 22, 1909 – February 23, 1985) was an agent of the U.S. Secret Service, best known as being the driver of President John F. Kennedy's presidential limousine in the motorcade through Dealey Plaza in Dallas on November 22, 1963, when the president was assassinated.

History
Greer was born on a farm in Stewartstown, County Tyrone, Ireland, and emigrated to the United States in 1929. He worked for over a decade as a chauffeur and servant to several wealthy families, including the Lodge family in Boston and a family in Dobbs Ferry, New York. During World War II, Greer enlisted in the U.S. Navy and was assigned to the presidential yacht in May, 1944. After his discharge in 1945, he joined the United States Secret Service on October 1 of that year.

Greer's duties brought him into close contact with Kennedy, and he can be seen in several pictures with the Kennedy family. He chauffeured the president on many occasions, including in Dallas. As with all agents involved, there has much speculation about, and criticism of, his actions on that day. Greer testified before the Warren Commission on March 9, 1964.

Greer retired on disability from the Secret Service in 1966 due to a stomach ulcer that grew worse following the Kennedy assassination. In 1973 he relocated to Waynesville, North Carolina, where he died of cancer.

Analysis and criticism
Secret Service procedures in place at the time did not allow Greer to take action without orders from senior agent Roy Kellerman, who sat to Greer's right. Kellerman has stated that he shouted, "Let's get out of line, we've been hit," but that Greer apparently turned to look at Kennedy before accelerating the car.

No agents were disciplined for their performance during the shooting, but privately, Jackie Kennedy was bitterly critical of the agents' performance, Greer's in particular, comparing him to the Kennedy children's nanny. Greer later apologized to her.

References

External links
 
 Stabilized Zapruder Film
 FBI Agent O'Neils Report

1909 births
1985 deaths
Deaths from cancer in North Carolina
Irish emigrants to the United States
People from County Tyrone
People from Waynesville, North Carolina
United States Secret Service agents
Witnesses to the assassination of John F. Kennedy